The mixed relay competition at the Biathlon World Championships 2019 was held on 7 March 2019.

Results
The race was started at 16:15.

References

Mixed relay
Mixed sports competitions